The World Games I taekwondo events in ten weight categories were held on July 29-31, 1981, at Toso Pavilion on the Santa Clara University campus. These were the first World Games, an international quadrennial multi-sport event, and were held in Santa Clara, California in the United States. The South Korean taekwondo athletes were favored to sweep the gold medals in all ten weight classes. The victory of a Canadian athlete in the heavyweight class was called "the biggest upset of World Games I."

Medalists

Details

Finweight

First round – Cesar Moran, Mexico, bye; Ki-moon Kwong, Korea, d. Emilio Azofra, Spain; Reinhard Langer, W. Germany, d. Kenny Couch, Australia; Aldo Codazzo, Italy, d. Yong-ho Park, Canada; Dae Sung Lee, U.S., d. Ching-sha Wang, Chinese Taipei. 

Second round – Kwong d. Moran. 

Final – Ki-moon Kwong d. Reinhard Langer, W. Germany; Dae Sung Lee, U.S., d. Aldo Codazzo, Italy. Gold, Kwong. Silver, Lee. Bronze, Langer and Codazzo.

Flyweight

First round – Rund Wong Fat, Netherlands, bye; Fernando Celada, Mexico, d. Chen-Chia Su, Chinese Taipei; Franco Banito, Spain, d. Anarjit Dosanjh, Canada; Salin Abel, Argentina, bye; Dominic Maelionico, Italy, d. Turgay Ertugral, W. Germany; Young Joon Kim, U.S., d. Tae Kim, Australia; Ki-mo Yang, Korea, bye. 

Second round – Maelionico d. Abel; Yang d. Kim.

Final – Ki-mo Yang, Korea, d. Maelionico, Italy; Franco Banito, Spain, d. Fernando Celada, Mexico. Gold, Yang. Silver, Benito. Bronze, Maelionico and Celada.

Bantamweight

First round – Chung Sik Choi, U.S., bye; Dicostanzo Germia, Italy, d. Tony Gibbs, Australia; Bum-soo Chung, Korea, d. Alphonse Kraidy, Ivory Coast; Jesus Benito, Spain, d. Ming Hui Chang, Chinese Taipei; Serge Langlois, Canada, bye; Rodca Miguel, Argentina, d. Jimmy de Fretes, Netherlands; Oscar Aguilar, Mexico, d. John Henry, Malaysia; Michael Pizybyla, W. Germany, bye. 

Second round – Germia d. Choi; Chung d. Benito; Langlois d. Miguel; Aguilar d. Pizybyla.

Final – Bum-soo Chung, Korea d. Dicostanzo Germia, Italy; Oscar Aguilar, Mexico d. Serge Langlois, Canada; Gold, Chung; Silver, Aguilar; Bronze, Germia and Langlois.

Featherweight

Final – Jun-kul Lee, Korea d. Juan Mangoni, Argentina; Jorge Garcia,  Spain d.  Raffaele Marchione, Italy.  Gold, Lee; Silver,  Garcia; Bronze, Mangoni and Marchione.

Lightweight

Final – Yung-kuk Kim, Korea d.  Kone Sowleymane, Ivory Coast; Alphonse Qahhaar, USA d. Luige Sienore, Italy. Gold,  Kim; Silver, Qahhaar,  USA; Bronze, Sowleymane and Sienore.

Welterweight

First round – Paul Rusca, Argentina, bye; Harald Scharmann, West Germany d.  Chien-hsueh Wang, Chinese Taipei; Marcel Delph, Canada d. Wong Siow Pang, Malaysia; Ruben Rhijs, Netherlands d. Michael O'Malley, USA; Michael Eddy, Australia, bye; Jeong-kuk Kim, Korea d. Hali Bamba, Ivory Coast; Antonio Herande, Mexico d. Scipione Massari, Italy; Julio Mora, Ecuador, bye. 

Second round – Rusca d. Scharmann; Rhijs d. Delph; Kim d. Eddy; Herande d. Mora. 

Final – Rusca d. Rhijs; Kim d. Herande;  Gold, Kim; Silver, Rusca; Bronze, Rhijs and Herande.

Light Middleweight

First round – Bruno Barberio, Italy, bye; Helmut Gartner, West Germany d. Livio Montiel, Argentina; Hans Brugmans, Netherlands d. Ming-te Huang, Chinese Taipei; Chui Hoe Kim, USA d. John Wong,  Malaysia; Paul McDonald, Canada, bye; Patrice Remarck, Ivory Coast d. Manuel Jurando, Mexico; A. Garrido, Spain d. Geoffrey Rees, Australia; Il-nam Oh, Korea, bye. 

Second round – Gartner d. Barberio; Kim d. Brugmans; Remarck d. McDonald; Oh d. Garrido. 

Final – Kim d. Gartner; Oh d. Remarck; Gold, Oh; Silver, Kim; Bronze, Gartner and Remarck.

Middleweight

First round – Jersey Long, Canada, bye; Patrice Remarck, Ivory Coast, d. Javier Mayan, Mexico; Jugi D'Oriano, Italy, d. Juan Carlo Escolano, Spain; Earl Taylor, U.S., bye; Jose Sanchez, Argentina, bye; Doong-joon Lee, Korea, d. Chih Chao Wang, Chinese Taipei; Andreas Scheffler, W. Germany, knocked out Gerrard Von der Berg, Netherlands; Damian McConachy, Australia, bye.

Second round – Long d. Remarck; D'Oriano d. Taylor; Lee d. Sanchez; Scheffler d. McConachy.

Final – Long d. D'Oriano; Lee d. Scheduler; Gold, Lee; Silver, Long; Bronze, Scheffler and D'Oriano

Light heavyweight

First round – Cisse Abouaye, Ivory Coast, bye; Ireno Fargas, Spain, knocked out Ben Oude Luttikhuis, Netherlands; Jean Picard, Canada, d. Duvan Velez, Ecuador; Thomas Roth, Mexico, d. (?) Tom Federle, U.S.; Felix Solas, Argentina, bye; Hsin-nien Sun, China Taipei, d. Carriatorz Walter, Italy; Colin Handley, Australia, d. Eugen Nefedow, W. Germany; Chan Jung, Korea, bye. 

Second round – Abouaye d. Fargas; Roth (?)  d. Picard; Sun TKO over Solas; Jung d. Handley.

Final – Abouaye d. Federle; Chan d. Sun. 
Gold, Jung; Silver, Abouaye; Bronze, Federle and Sun

Heavyweight

First round – Miguel Esquivel, Mexico, bye; Michael Arndt, W. Germany, d. Puppo Ricardo, Argentina; Ching-man Park, Korea, d. Kim Royce, U.S.; Harry Prijs, Netherlands, d. Chung-Il Teng, Chinese Taipei; Darrell Hanegan, Canada, d. Keith Whittemore, Australia; Cvozzo Bruno, Italy, bye. 

Second round – Esquivel d. Arndt; Hannegan knocked out Bruno, 2nd round.

Final – Darrell Hanegan, Canada, d. Park Chong Man, Korea. Gold, Hanegan. Silver, Man. Bronze, Harry Prijs, Netherlands, and Miguel Esquivel, Mexico.

References

External links
World Taekwondo Federation

1981
1981 in taekwondo
1981 World Games